The seventh series of Ex on the Beach, a British television programme that aired on 20 June 2017 on MTV. The group of cast for this series include Geordie Shore stars Chloe Ferry and Marty McKenna, Love Island contestants Max Morley and Josh Ritchie, as well as Beauty School Cop Outs cast member Savannah Kemplay. Star of series five David Hawley also featured in this series. Marty and Josh had also previously appeared in the third and sixth series of the show respectively.

Cast

The official list of cast members were released on 23 May 2017. They include four boys; Dean Ralph, Jordan Wright, Marty McKenna and Max Morley, and four girls: Che McSorley, Fatima Rull, Nicole Dutt and Savannah Kemplay. Marty has previously appeared in the third series of the show as well as featuring as a cast member on Geordie Shore, whereas Max won the first series of Love Island. Savannah also previously appeared in Beauty School Cop Outs. With the announcement of the line-up it was also confirmed that Marty's fellow Geordie Shore star Chloe Ferry would be arriving on the beach as an ex as well as Josh Ritchie, who is returning from the sixth series of the show. He also appeared alongside Max on Love Island. Star of the fifth series David Hawley will also be returning to the series.

All original cast members arrived at the beach during the first episode and were immediately told to prepare for the arrival of their exes. LeNicole was removed from the villa during the second episode after a violent altercation with Fatima, just missing out on Brad's arrival, her ex-boyfriend who also arrived during this episode. The third episode featured the debut of Georgia Crone, the ex-girlfriend of Max. Stevie Colley was the fifth ex to arrive, making her debut in episode five. She was the ex-girlfriend of Dean, who arrived wanting to potentially rekindle things. The fifth episode included the arrival of Chloe's ex-boyfriend Sam Scott. Che's twin sister Leonie McSorley also debuted during this episode despite not having an ex in the villa. During the sixth episode, Sydney Longmuir became the next human wrecking ball to arrive on the beach. She arrived as Jordan's ex-girlfriend wanting painful revenge. Georgia's next ex-boyfriend John Speed turned up during the seventh episode in a bid to win her back, and Brad was sent home after the Tablet of Terror gave her the option to send one of the boys home. Star of series 5, David Hawley returned to the beach during the eighth episode as the ex-boyfriend of Fatima, whilst Marty was given the option to send one couple home. He chose Jordan and Sydney. Sam Reece made his debut during the ninth episode where he arrived determined to get revenge on his ex-one night stand Georgia. The final ex to enter the villa was Love Island contestant and star of series 6, Josh Ritchie, the ex of both Che and Georgia. The Tablet of Terror also delivered its final blow to the cast, forcing Georgia to send one boy back into the sea. She chose Sam Reece.

Bold indicates original cast member; all other cast were brought into the series as an ex.

Duration of cast

Table Key
 Key:  = "Cast member" is featured in this episode
 Key:  = "Cast member" arrives on the beach
 Key:  = "Cast member" has an ex arrive on the beach
 Key:  = "Cast member" arrives on the beach and has an ex arrive during the same episode
 Key:  = "Cast member" leaves the beach
 Key:  = "Cast member" has an ex arrive on the beach and leaves during the same episode
 Key:  = "Cast member" arrives on the beach and leaves during the same episode
 Key:  = "Cast member" does not feature in this episode

Episodes

{| class="wikitable plainrowheaders" style="width:100%"
|- style="color:black"
! style="background:#DA5FFF;"| No. inseries
! style="background:#DA5FFF;"| No. inseason
! style="background:#DA5FFF;"| Title
! style="background:#DA5FFF;"| Original air date
! style="background:#DA5FFF;"| Duration
! style="background:#DA5FFF;"| UK viewers

|}

Ratings

References

External links
Official website

2017 British television seasons
07